Arnold Charlesworth (6 July 1930 – 1972) is an English former professional footballer who played as an inside forward in the Football League for York City, in non-League football for Boston United and Grantham, and was on the books of West Bromwich Albion and Rotherham United without making a league appearance.

References

1930 births
1972 deaths
English footballers
Footballers from Sheffield
Association football forwards
Boston United F.C. players
West Bromwich Albion F.C. players
Rotherham United F.C. players
York City F.C. players
Grantham Town F.C. players
English Football League players
Midland Football League players